Anne Passovoy is active in science fiction fandom and filk music, and has won two Pegasus Awards. She is married to Bob Passovoy. She has written many filk songs, including "Marcon Ballroom" and writing perhaps the most widely sung tune for Poul Anderson's poem, "Mary O'Meara."

Robert A. Heinlein in part dedicated his 1982 novel Friday to Anne.

Along with her husband, she was the Fan Guest of Honor at Chicon 2000. Anne and Bob Passovoy were inducted into the Filk Hall of Fame in 2008.

References

External links
 Chicon 2000 Fan Guest of Honor bio
 A 2000 interview with Anne and Bob
 Pegasus Awards won by Anne

Living people
Filkers
Year of birth missing (living people)
Women songwriters